"Bird of Prey" is a song by British rock band Uriah Heep, from the group's US version of their 1970 debut album Very 'Eavy... Very 'Umble (released as Uriah Heep in the United States). A re-recorded version of the song would appear on the European version of 1971's album Salisbury. The original 1970 version of the song would later appear on the European 2003 remaster of Very 'Eavy... Very 'Umble. Although not released as a single, the song is regarded by many fans as one of the band's most popular songs.  The song is the B-side of the band's first ever worldwide single "Gypsy".

In popular culture
In 2009 the intro to the song (approximately from 8–14 seconds) was  sampled by the American Rapper Xzibit in his single "Hurt Locker".

Personnel
 Mick Box – lead guitar
 David Byron – lead vocals
 Ken Hensley –  organ, mellotron
 Paul Newton – bass guitar, vocals
 Keith Baker – drums

References

1970 songs
Uriah Heep (band) songs
Songs written by Ken Hensley
Songs written by David Byron
Songs written by Mick Box